Warsaw Autumn (Warszawska Jesień) is the largest international Polish festival of contemporary music.  Indeed, for many years, it was the only festival of its type in Central and Eastern Europe.  It was founded in 1956 by two composers, Tadeusz Baird and Kazimierz Serocki, and officially established by the Head Board of the Polish Composers' Union.  It is an annual event, normally taking place in the second half of September and lasts for 8 days.

History
The first festival took place in 10–20 October 1956. In 1957 and 1982 there was no festival.

The first years of the festival, reaching back to the late 1980s, was a period of particular magnificence. From the beginning of its existence the festival's program foundations were clear. The festival's leading aim was (and is) to present new music from Poland and around the world. Adrian Thomas notes that the music performed at Warsaw Autumn between 1958 and 1961 "clearly charts the process of informing Polish audiences and composers of what was happening in the West . At the same time, the amount of Polish repertoire increased from 25% in 1958 to 30% in 1961 .

The Polish Composers' Union still plays a large role in the organisation of the festival, and the director of the festival is currently Jerzy Kornowicz.

Warsaw Autumn Repertoire

The Warsaw Autumn featured many Polish and World premieres by both non-Polish as well as Polish composers. The following list includes some of the pieces that were performed .

1956
Witold Lutosławski, Concerto for Orchestra (1963 UNESCO 1st Prize)

1958
Tadeusz Baird, Four Essays (World Premiere) (1959 UNESCO 1st Prize (shared with Lutosławski)) 
Henryk Górecki, Epitaph (World Premiere)
Witold Lutosławski, Musique funèbre / Funeral Music (1959 UNESCO 1st Prize (shared with Baird))

1959
Henryk Górecki, Symphony No. 1 (World Premiere) (1961 UNESCO Youth Biennale 1st Prize)

1960
Henryk Górecki, Scontri (World Premiere)

1961
Tadeusz Baird, Love Poems (World Premiere) 
Henryk Górecki, Three Diagrams (World Premiere)
Witold Lutosławski, Jeux vénitiens / Venetian Games (World Premiere) (1962 UNESCO 1st Prize)
Krzysztof Penderecki, Threnody to the Victims of Hiroshima (World Premiere) (1961 UNESCO Winner)

2014 
 Neo Temporis Group (Ensemble Nostri Temporis and NeoQuartet)

See also
List of experimental music festivals
Kontrasty

References

External links 
 Official site

Music festivals in Poland
Events in Warsaw
20th-century classical music
20th century in music
Modernism (music)
Recurring events established in 1956
1956 establishments in Poland
Contemporary classical music festivals
Experimental music festivals
Music festivals established in 1956
Classical music festivals in Poland
Autumn events in Poland